Edward Gibson (born 1936) is a former NASA astronaut.

Edward Gibson may also refer to:

Edward Gibson (painter) (1668/9–1701), English portrait painter and draughtsman
Edward Gibson, 1st Baron Ashbourne (1837–1913), Irish lawyer and Lord Chancellor of Ireland
Hoot Gibson (1892–1962), American actor, real name Edmund Gibson, but once billed as Edward
Edward H. Gibson (1872–1942), U.S. Army sergeant awarded the Medal of Honor for actions during the Philippine–American War
Edward Gibson (cricketer) (1899–1944), English cricketer
Eppie Gibson (Edward Gibson), rugby league footballer of the 1940s and 1950s for England, and Workington Town
Det. Ed Gibson, fictional character played by Larry Hagman on daytime soap opera The Edge of Night